The 1963 Oregon State Beavers football team represented Oregon State University as an independent during the 1963 NCAA University Division football season.  In their ninth season under head coach Tommy Prothro, the Beavers compiled a 5–5 record and were outscored 198 to 192.  The team played two home games on campus at Parker Stadium in Corvallis, and two at Multnomah Stadium in Portland.

Schedule

Roster
E Vern Burke, Sr.
OL Rich Koeper, Jr.
QB Gordon Queen

References

External links
 WSU Libraries: Game video – Washington State at Oregon State – October 19, 1963

Oregon State
Oregon State Beavers football seasons
Oregon State Beavers football